Harju Elu is the official weekly newspaper of Harju County, Estonia.

History and profile
The paper was founded in 1944. From 1993 to 2007 it carried the name of Harjumaa.

References

External links
 

1944 establishments in the Soviet Union
Harju County
Newspapers published in Estonia
Publications established in 1944
Weekly newspapers
Estonian-language newspapers